Canaan is a town in Essex County, Vermont, United States. The population was 896 at the 2020 census. Canaan contains the village of Beecher Falls, located at the confluence of the Connecticut River and Halls Stream. It is part of the Berlin, NH–VT Micropolitan Statistical Area.

Due to Québécois ancestry, 26% of Canaan residents speak French as their primary language, making the town one of New England's "Little Canadas." This is a decrease from 1982, when nearly 44% spoke French as their native language.

Geography

Canaan is the northeasternmost town in Vermont, bordered by the Canadian province of Quebec to the north and the U.S. state of New Hampshire to the east. It is one of two towns in Vermont to share a border with both another state and Canada, the other such town being Alburgh in the northwestern corner. Canaan has two border crossings with Quebec, each approximately 3 miles (4.8 km) apart. The border crossings are, from west to east, Canaan–Hereford Road Border Crossing, accessed by Vermont Route 141 and Quebec Route 141, and Beecher Falls–East Hereford Border Crossing, accessed by Vermont Route 253 and Quebec Route 253. Canaan is also the only town in Vermont to share a land border with New Hampshire—the town's far northeastern corner touches the southwestern corner of the town of Pittsburg—as the Connecticut River defines the state line from Canaan southward.

Demographics

As of the census of 2000, there were 1,078 people, 441 households, and 306 families living in the town.  The population density was 32.5 people per square mile (12.5/km2).  There were 650 housing units at an average density of 19.6 per square mile (7.6/km2).  The racial makeup of the town was 95.83% White, 0.19% African American, 0.83% Native American, 0.09% Asian, and 3.06% from two or more races. Hispanic or Latino of any race were 0.28% of the population.

There were 441 households, out of which 33.6% had children under the age of 18 living with them, 55.1% were married couples living together, 8.6% had a female householder with no husband present, and 30.4% were non-families. 26.8% of all households were made up of individuals, and 11.1% had someone living alone who was 65 years of age or older.  The average household size was 2.44 and the average family size was 2.94.

In the town, the population was spread out, with 26.9% under the age of 18, 6.2% from 18 to 24, 27.6% from 25 to 44, 25.4% from 45 to 64, and 13.8% who were 65 years of age or older.  The median age was 39 years. For every 100 females, there were 100.0 males.  For every 100 females age 18 and over, there were 97.5 males.

The median income for a household in the town was $32,574, and the median income for a family was $36,705. Males had a median income of $28,913 versus $21,544 for females. The per capita income for the town was $14,131.  About 10.2% of families and 14.3% of the population were below the poverty line, including 16.7% of those under age 18 and 18.7% of those age 65 or over.

Government

Social services
Social services are provided in part by the Northeast Kingdom Community Action, located here and in other Northeast Kingdom sites.

Northeast Kingdom Learning Services  provides Adult Education and Literacy and High School Completion services to Canaan at no charge.

Town Meeting 
Canaan, Vermont holds a town meeting on town meeting day, held in the school's gymnasium.

Economy 
Since the start of the 20th century, Canaan has lost many logging jobs and most family farms. Tourism is now an important part of the local economy.

The Beecher Falls furniture factory, a division of Ethan Allen, closed its manufacturing unit in August 2009, laying off 238 workers and leaving only the rough mill open. The plant opened in 1895 and was once the largest furniture factory east of Michigan.

See also
 Alice M. Ward Library

References

External links
 Town of Canaan official website
 Canaan schools

 
Towns in Vermont
Berlin, New Hampshire micropolitan area
Vermont populated places on the Connecticut River
Towns in Essex County, Vermont